The 2019–20 ACB season, also known as Liga Endesa for sponsorship reasons, was the 37th season of the top Spanish professional basketball league, since its establishment in 1983. It started on 24 September 2019 with the first round of the regular season and ended on 30 June 2020 in an exceptional end-of-season tournament in Valencia due to the COVID-19 pandemic.

Real Madrid was the defending champion which was eliminated by San Pablo Burgos which qualified to semifinals for its first time. Kirolbet Baskonia won their fourth ACB and Spanish title after 10 years of the last Spanish title.

Teams

Promotion and relegation (pre-season)
A total of 18 teams contested the league, including 16 sides from the 2018–19 season and two promoted from the 2018–19 LEB Oro. This include the top team from the LEB Oro, and the winners of the LEB Oro Final Four.

Teams promoted from LEB Oro
Coosur Real Betis
RETAbet Bilbao Basket

Venues and locations

Personnel and sponsorship

Managerial changes

Season summary
On March 10, 2020, the Ministry of Health of Spain decreed that all games would be played behind closed doors due to the COVID-19 pandemic. On March 11, 2020, ACB postponed all the games of the Rounds 24 and 25, as well as those postponed games that were planned in this period. On March 16, 2020, the ACB clubs agreed unanimously on the temporary suspension of the league until April 24. On April 2, 2020, ACB suspended indefinitely the league and started to work on future scenarios to restart the league. On April 20, 2020, the ACB clubs agreed unanimously to finish prematurely the regular season due to force majeure and to continue the league with a 12-team format with two groups and a Final Four to decide the winner, with all games played in a single stage. Relegations to LEB Oro were revoked. On May 27, 2020, ACB selected and announced Valencia to host the exceptional playoffs in the two last weeks of June. The matches were played in La Fonteta and the teams trained in L'Alqueria del Basket which had 9 indoor courts, 4 outdoor courts and 15,000 square metres.

Regular season

League table

Positions by round
The table lists the positions of teams after completion of each round. In order to preserve chronological evolvements, any postponed matches are not included in the round at which they were originally scheduled, but added to the full round they were played immediately afterwards.

Results

Playoffs

Group stage

Group A

Group B

Final Four

Final standings

Attendances
Attendances only include regular season games:

Awards
All official awards of the 2019–20 ACB season.

MVP

Source:

Finals MVP

Source:

All-ACB Teams

Source:

Best Young Player Award

Source:

Best All-Young Team

Source:

Player of the round

Source:

Player of the month

Source:

ACB clubs in international competitions

Notes

References

External links
 Official website 

 
ACB
Spanish
Liga ACB seasons
ACB